Ember Falls is a Finnish heavy metal band based in Tampere. Ember Falls was formed in 2015 after the breakup of the band Mekanism, which was founded in 2010. The band released the first single Shut Down with Me in the same year. Ember Falls signed a worldwide record deal with Spinefarm Records.
Their first album Welcome to Ember Falls was released in February 2017.

The band's music is influenced by melodic metal as well as pop and electronic music.

Members

Current members 
 Tuomas Välimaa – vocals
 Jussi Laakso – lead guitar
 Kalle Laakso – guitar and supporting vocals
 Jussi Saurio – drums
 Olli Heino – bass

Former members 
 OneOfHaze – keyboard (2015-2019)

Discography

Albums 
 Welcome to Ember Falls (2017)
 Ruins (2021)

Singles 
 Shut Down with Me (2015)
 COE (2016)
 The Cost of Doing Business (2016)
 Rising Tide (2017)
 Heart Shaped Black Scar (2019)
 Divine (2019)
 We Are Become Fire (2020)
 The World Is Burning (2020)
 For All (2021)
 The Wall (2021)
 Over My Dead Body (2021)
 Cloud Connected (2022)

References 

Finnish alternative metal musical groups
Finnish melodic death metal musical groups
Finnish heavy metal musical groups